Gurajena is ahieftainship which was reduced to Headman during the colonial Era in the Masvingo Province of Zimbabwe. It is located about 60 km north east of Masvingo and can be reached by following Zimuto Road north and then branching off at Maraire shopping centre to go due north east and crossing the Munyambe River, which is the border between Gutu and Zimuto, just before reaching the shopping centre. It is almost exactly due east of Gwengwerere Growth Point, Zimbabwe.  It was named after Chief Gurajena whose Chieftainship still lay unclaimed ever since he was dethroned during the white colonial rule.  It is one of the oldest growth points in the areas. There are several villages under Chief Gurajena and most of the land for this chieftainship was taken by the then white farmers nicknamed Chimunyanja and Kurutu.

The villages under Gurajena are Muzondo, Makozvo/Zimbume, Mareva, Gambiza, Chinyanganya, Mangwaya, Mutami and many more villages and there is a school named Gurajena Primary School and the secondary called Mavhiringidze which another of the Gurajena clan and the school was named in honour of Mavhiringidze who is buried in the school yard.

There are several primary schools under Gurajena are and only one secondary services Gurajena area the area is a very peaceful area and mostly inhabited by the people of the Dziva totem and Ngara totem.

References

Populated places in Masvingo Province